Cinder Cone is  the proper name of 2 peaks in Canada and 7 peaks in the United States:

In Canada:

In the United States:

Cinder cone
Cinder cones